Roberth Björknesjö (born 30 April 1973 in Stockholm) is a Swedish football manager. He is in charge of IF Brommapojkarna in the Division 1.

References

1973 births
Living people
AIK Fotboll players
Swedish footballers
IF Brommapojkarna managers
Swedish football managers
Vasalunds IF players
Syrianska FC managers
Assyriska FF managers
Östers IF managers
Väsby IK managers
Association football midfielders
Footballers from Stockholm